FNU can refer to:

 Fiji National University
 Florida National University, in Hialeah, Florida, United States
 Frontier Nursing University, in Hyden, Kentucky, United States
 Fujian Normal University, in China
 Oristano-Fenosu Airport, in Sardinia, Italy
 First Name Unknown, a placeholder name for an unknown first name.